Pterocles  is a genus of near passerine birds in the sandgrouse family. It includes all the species in the family except for two central Asian species in Syrrhaptes

These sandgrouse have small, pigeon-like heads and necks, but sturdy compact bodies. They have long pointed wings and sometimes tails. Their legs are feathered down to the toes, but unlike species of the genus Syrrhaptes the toes are not feathered.

Pterocles species have a fast direct flight, and flocks fly to watering holes at dawn and dusk.

Two to three eggs are laid directly on the ground. They are buff or greenish with cryptic markings. All species are resident.

Taxonomy
The genus Pterocles was introduced in 1815 by the Dutch zoologist Coenraad Jacob Temminck. The type species was subsequently designated by the English zoologist George Robert Gray as the pin-tailed sandgrouse. The genus name combines the Ancient Greek pteron meaning "wing" with -klēs meaning "notable" or "splendid".

Species
The genus contains 14 species:

References

External links
Sandgrouse videos on the Internet Bird Collection

 
Bird genera